Kanamachi was a Kolkata-Bengali TV series that premiered on 9 June 2014 on the channel Star Jalsha. 
The series starred Farhan Imroze and Joyeeta Goswami in lead roles and Anindita Bose, Sudip Mukherjee, Monoj Ojha and Mohua Halder in supporting roles. It was directed by Suman Das and Tamal Maity.

Plot

The series stars a young IPS officer Abhimanyu (Farhan Imroze) and a young girl Kotha (Joyeeta Goswami) from the Robin Hood Gang. The Robin Hood Gang is a team of six members led by the Master, Indrajit Roy (Sudip Mukherjee). The squad was formed by the Master specifically to exact severe retribution against particular people from the past, even though it was intended to serve the interests of underprivileged people. Abhi's task was to apprehend the Robin Hood Gang, and by discovering the way to join the squad, he almost succeeds. Abhi, eventually realizes that the team was full of mystery, and his curiosity fastened him to disguise as a member of the team until he is accomplished in revealing the entire mystery of the team. Delay of the arrest sent threat to Abhi from the police department, and finally the order comes to killing all the members of the team. Abhi does not do so – rather he keeps on finding the mystery behind the team. As a result, the department suspends Abhi. In fact, the act of suspending was committed by a Minister.
 
The Minister, a lawyer (Ramen Shikder) and a doctor (Kamalesh Chatterjee) was once involved in a crime of framing two persons, one was the father of Kotha (Shounak Mitra) and the other was the Master himself. As a matter of fact, Master was a police officer who tried to uncover the real truth behind their act against Kotha's father, but the three of the master-villain frames him in an act of molestation over a woman, which results in execution. But fortunately Master survives, and creates the Robin Hood team for retaliation.
 
Abhi tried to help find Kotha's mother, who was lost from her when she was a child. As the case was related of Kotha's father and the Master was the same, Abhi seems to reach to uncover the truth at an astonishing pace. The whole mystery was related to an NGO called Banerji NGO. Master tries to scare the three villains by prank calls, which leads to a thought to the Minister that the whole problem of prank was done by Abhi due to suspending him, consequently trying to kill him. But every time he tries to do so, he fails to accomplish because of Abhi's quick-witted talents. Eventually Doctor Kamalesh, one of the three villains, was killed by the Minister. Furthermore, he killed Jiban Shomaddar (uncle to Kotha), who was the only evidence of the Banerji NGO in Abhi's opinion – later Abhi realizes that that was not the only option. Minister's wishes to kill Abhi and Kotha brings an officer Bhashkor in the series, who constantly attempts to do so for in vain.
 
Eventually Abhi solves the whole mystery and learns what actually instigated Master to form Team Robinhood. Abhi's paternal aunt, Malabika Banerjee, who was the head of the Banerjee-NGO, along with the Minister, the Lawyer (Ramen) and the dead doctor (Kamalesh) was engaged in trafficking. Sounak Mitra, Kotha's father, had somehow learnt the truth and so the three had caused ample harassment to him – got him arrested on false charges of molestation, following which Sounak had committed suicide. The three had also molested Amrita Das Majumder, a woman working in the NGO. Indrajit Roy (Master), who was then an honest police officer was investigating the case but the minister and his troops had even trapped Indrajit and Indrajit was prosecuted. But Indrajit somehow escaped death and formed team Robinhood in order to punish the Minister and help the common masses. Later we come to know that Master is Abhi's real father and Abinash Mukherjee had adopted him.
 
After completing the investigation, Abhi vows to punish the actual criminals and give justice to Master. Therefore, he has the team arrested. The whole team gets angry with Abhi and calls him a betrayer. But at the end, the Minister and Ramen get punished. Leela, Kotha's mother, who, after her husband's death, had been forced to take up prostitution, shoots the Minister to death. At the end, Abhi introduces Kotha to her mother.
 
Kotha, after a year, gets released from the jail, which brings a new plot to the story. While returning to her convent school in Darjeeling , she comes across Anindya and Tanaya. They meet with a car accident and so by twist of fate (in which Tanaya dies), Kotha has to come back to Kolkata as Tojo's (Tanaya's son) governess. There she wins the heart of everyone. In the meantime, Ananya (sister to Tanaya) and Shima (mother to Tanaya) tries to trigger conspiracy on Kotha, but Kotha is intelligent enough to fight back. Meanwhile, Anindo falls for Kotha and wants to marry her, to which Kotha agrees for Tojo's sake, although she loves Abhi. But later, Anindya sacrifices Kotha after realizing her love for Abhi and then, Abhi finally marries Kotha. However, the actual identity of Master, that is, Master or Indrajit Roy is himself Abhi's real father was not revealed to Abhi.

Cast
 Farhan Imroze as Abhimanyu
 Joyeeta Goswami as Katha
 Anindita Bose as Sania
 Sudip Mukherjee as Master
 Manoj Ojha as Anindya Mukherjee
 Mohua Haldar as Tanaya Mukherjee
 Swagata Mukherjee as Leela

References

 http://www.startv.in/channel/star-jalsha/15
 http://www.startv.in/show/kanamachi/887
 http://timesofindia.indiatimes.com/tv/news/bengali/Farhan-jealous-of-Raj-Chakrabortys-gift-to-his-heroine/articleshow/40006084.cms

External links
 Kanamachi at Disney+ Hotstar
 
2014 Indian television series debuts
2015 Indian television series endings
Bengali-language television programming in India
Star Jalsha original programming